Happy Hunting may refer to:
 Happy Hunting (musical), a 1956 musical
 Happy Hunting (film), a 2016 American western horror film

See also
 Happy hunting ground, a concept of the afterlife associated with Native Americans in the United States